Chrysolarentia squamulata, the scaled carpet, is a species of moth of the family Geometridae first described by William Warren in 1899. It is found in Australia.

References

External links
Australian Faunal Directory

Euphyia